"Last Cigarette Ever" is the 11th episode of the fifth season of the CBS situation comedy How I Met Your Mother and 99th episode overall. It aired on December 14, 2009.

Plot

Future Ted explains how frustrated Robin got at her early morning news show, and describes her taking a smoke break up on the roof, much to the surprise of his listening children. She is then joined by Marshall, who is stressed about his new department head Arthur Hobbs. Barney explains that Marshall's job is at risk because Hobbs does not remember Marshall, even though Marshall worked for him before and made an angry, explosive speech when he quit. When Marshall takes a rooftop break at work, he bumps into Hobbs, and to gain his confidence, they share a smoke.

Even though Marshall rigorously cleans himself, Lily can still smell the smoke on him, and soon uses it as an excuse to start smoking again herself, which leads to her voice lowering to a raspy growl. Finally, Ted and Barney feel left out as their friends smoke outside MacLaren's, and they join in as well. As the week continues, their smoking takes its toll, decreasing Ted's stamina on the stairs, worsening Lily's voice, burning Barney's tie, and giving Hobbs a heart attack. They all pledge to stop smoking, though Robin is reluctant at first.

Meanwhile, Robin is joined by a new co-anchor, Don Frank, a legend of the pre-6am television world, having been broadcast in 38 media outlets. Robin is impressed at first, but is quickly disappointed by Don's lack of professionalism and total indifference to his job—to the point that he does the news in his underwear. She works even harder to prove that her job means something, even booking Mayor Bloomberg on the show. When Don tells her to stop taking her job so seriously, Robin loses her temper and calls Don a rude, unprofessional loser; in the middle of her tirade, Don tells her that the Mayor cancelled. As Don lights up a cigarette and offers it to Robin, saying she will never quit smoking, the gang calls from the apartment, pleading for her not to break their pact. She agrees, but when she returns to the apartment, she finds everyone smoking on the roof and joins them, having bought a pack on the way home. Future Ted reveals that Robin and Don were dating within three months.

The gang agrees to have "one last cigarette" as the sun rises, but Future Ted reveals it took years for each member of the gang to actually quit, listing events in their lives that lead to the change: Lily quits the day she decides to try to get pregnant; Marshall quits the day his son is born; Robin quits in June 2013; Barney quits in March 2017; and Ted quits two weeks into dating the children's mother.

Throughout the episode, Marshall says he had his first cigarette when he was 13, and is shown periodically imagining himself travelling back in time and beating up his younger self for taking up the habit in the first place. At the end of the episode, Marshall once again visits his 13-year-old counterpart in 1991, but instead of beating him up, he apologizes and gives him a peace offering: a picture of Lily, to which Young Marshall replies "Wow, she's hot!". Marshall explains to his younger self that he will one day marry her. Surprised and excited, Young Marshall disappears into his tent with the picture to apparently masturbate; present Marshall is disgusted at first, but then understands and walks away.

Critical response

Donna Bowman of The A.V. Club rated the episode with a grade A−.

Joel Keller, reviewer at TV Squad, described the casting of Harvey Fierstein as Lily's smoking voice as only the third funniest thing in the episode. He praises the flashback scenes to 13-year-old Marshall's first smoke as the funniest thing in the episode.

Brian Zoromski of IGN gave the episode only 5.5 out of 10. Zoromski noted that he had never been a smoker and described this as the worst episode ever.

TV Critic gave it 52 out of 100, commenting on the episode's humor: "These jokes wouldn't happen in real life and so each time one appears it induces a groan rather than a laugh."

References

External links

How I Met Your Mother (season 5) episodes
2009 American television episodes